For the Kids is a series albums featuring renderings of children's songs performed by contemporary popular artists. In the United States, a portion of the proceeds go to VH1's Save the Music Foundation. In Canada, a portion of the proceeds go to The Sarah McLachlan Music Outreach (Sarah McLachlan Foundation).

There are two follow-up compilation albums: For the Kids Too! (2004) and For the Kids Three (2007).

Track listing

For the Kids Too!

For the Kids Three!

References

Children's music albums
2002 compilation albums